The Spirit of the Suwannee Music Park is a park located in North Central Florida, in Suwannee County, United States.

Overview  
Situated on the banks of the historic Suwannee River, the park consists of over 800 acres (2.4 km²) of camping areas, concert venues, recreational facilities, and unspoiled forests. The park hosts numerous major events each year, including Suwannee Hulaween, Suwannee River Jam, the Suwannee Roots Revival , Wanee Music Festival, Brainquility,  Purple Hatter's Ball, Suwannee Rising, and Suwannee Spring Reunion.

Spirit of the Suwannee Music Park, nestled in Live Oak, Florida, with 3 miles of the Suwannee river bordering the park, hosts over 25 diverse, fun events throughout the year. Besides a variety of other flora and fauna, it includes a large bat house which has become a home to an increasing number of bats.

The Cornett family has been making improvements to the park to enhance and improve its entertainment, hiking, canoeing, camping, and other activities. The park offers varied camping options including primitive camping, RV camping, and furnished park models. The "Spirit Treehouse" is also available for different occasions and events. In 2015, the park was featured on an episode of "Treehouse Guys" a reality TV show on the DIY Network.  The episode, titled "A 100-Year Old Oak Tree" was the most-watched episode of the series, and featured the construction of a new multi-story treehouse built on the banks of the Suwannee River.   The matriarch of the park, Jean Carrithers Cornett is featured prominently in the show as she died during the filming.  The massive treehouse is now called the "Mother Tree" in her honor, and is open for tours on weekends.

The 2015 Suwannee Hulaween Music Festival had record-breaking attendance for the Spirit of the Suwannee Music Park with 21,000 attendees.

External links
 Spirit of the Suwannee Music Park

References

Parks in Suwannee County, Florida
Suwannee River